The 2015 Big Ten Conference football season was the 120th season of college football play for the Big Ten Conference and was a part of the 2015 NCAA Division I FBS football season. The conference began its season on Thursday, September 3, with Michigan and Minnesota opening their seasons. The remainder of the teams in the conference began their seasons on September 4 and 5.

This was the Big Ten's second season with 14 teams. The league was home to the defending national champion and inaugural winner of the College Football Playoff in Ohio State.

The Big Ten also welcomed four new head coaches for the 2015 season.  Jim Harbaugh replaced Brady Hoke as head coach at Michigan, Mike Riley took over for Bo Pelini at Nebraska, Paul Chryst came in as the head man at Wisconsin, replacing Gary Andersen, and Bill Cubit served as the interim head coach at Illinois after Tim Beckman was fired just one week before the beginning of the season.  There were also two coaching changes made during the middle of the 2015 season.  On October 13, Maryland dismissed coach Randy Edsall and named his offensive coordinator Mike Locksley as interim coach for the rest of the season.  On October 28, Jerry Kill retired as Minnesota's head coach due to health concerns.  His defensive coordinator Tracy Claeys was named as interim coach before being named the permanent replacement on November 11.

In preseason polling, Ohio State was unanimously voted to repeat as the Big Ten champion by the media in the Big Ten Preseason poll, receiving all 40 first place votes. The Badgers were favorites to win the Big Ten West Division with 32 votes, followed by Nebraska with five and Minnesota with three.

At the conclusion of the regular season, Iowa won the West Division championship with a perfect 12-0 (8-0) record.  Michigan State and Ohio State finished tied atop the East Division standings, both at 11-1 (7-1), but Michigan State's head-to-head victory placed the Spartans into the Big Ten Championship Game opposite Iowa.  Following the season, Illinois removed the interim tag from Bill Cubit's title and gave him a two-year contract as head coach, while Rutgers has decided to part ways with Kyle Flood.

In the Big Ten Championship Game, Michigan State defeated Iowa 16-13 to win their second Big Ten championship in three years.  With the win, the Spartans advance to the College Football Playoff.  Iowa and Ohio State were both placed into New Year's Six Bowls, going to the Rose and Fiesta Bowls, respectively.  A total of 10 Big Ten teams went to bowl games in 2015, including Nebraska and Minnesota, both with 5-7 records.

Rankings

Schedule

In 2015, Penn State will be the only Big Ten team that will not play a non-conference game against a Power Five conference team.

All times Eastern time.

† denotes Homecoming game

Week 1

Week 2

Week 3

Week 4

Week 5

Week 6

Week 7

Week 8

Week 9

Week 10

Week 11

Week 12

Week 13

Big Ten Championship Game

Bowl games
Big Ten bowl games for the 2015 season are:

Rankings are from AP Poll.  All times Eastern Time Zone.

Records against FBS conferences
2015 records against FBS conferences (through January 2, 2016):

Players of the Week

Players of the Year
2015 Big Ten Player of the Year Awards

All-conference players
2015 Big Ten All-Conference Honors

Unanimous selections in ALL CAPS

Coaches Honorable Mention: ILLINOIS: Geronimo Allison, Taylor Barton, V'Angelo Bentley (return specialist), Clayton Fejedelem, Ted Karras, Mason Monheim, T.J. Neal, Austin Schmidt, Dawuane Smoot, Jihad Ward; INDIANA: Simmie Cobbs, Michael Cooper, Darius Latham, Nick Mangieri, Zack Shaw; IOWA: Cole Fisher, Jaleel Johnson, Dillon Kidd, Desmond King (return specialist), Ben Niemann, Matt VandeBerg, Sean Welsh; MARYLAND: Jermaine Carter, Michael Dunn, Quinton Jefferson; MICHIGAN: Kenny Allen, Joe Bolden, Ben Braden, Mason Cole, Amara Darboh, Graham Glasgow, Ryan Glasgow, Willie Henry, Kyle Kalis, Desmond Morgan, Blake O'Neil, Jake Rudock, De'Veon Smith, Jarrod Wilson; MICHIGAN STATE: Jon Reschke, R.J. Shelton, Lawrence Thomas; MINNESOTA: Briean Boddy-Calhoun, Shannon Brooks, De'Vondre Campbell, Theiren Cockran, Brandon Lingen, KJ Maye, Jalen Myrick, Jonah Pirsig, Steven Richardson; NEBRASKA: Drew Brown, Nate Gerry, Andy Janovich, Joshua Kalu; NORTHWESTERN: Deonte Gibson, Solomon Vault (return specialist); OHIO STATE: Tyquan Lewis, Jalin Marshall (return specialist), Braxton Miller, Tyvis Powell, Nick Vannett; PENN STATE: Marcus Allen, Jason Cabinda, Trevor Williams; PURDUE: Anthony Brown, Markell Jones, Robert Kugler, Jake Replogle, Frankie Williams; RUTGERS: Leonte Caroo, Steve Longa, Keith Lumpkin; WISCONSIN: T.J. Edwards, Troy Fumagalli, Darius Hillary, Tanner McEvoy.

Media Honorable Mention: ILLINOIS: Geronimo Allison, Taylor Barton, V'Angelo Bentley (return specialist), Mason Monheim, T.J. Neal, Austin Schmidt, Dawuane Smoot, Jihad Ward; INDIANA: Simmie Cobbs, Michael Cooper, Nick Mangieri, Marcus Oliver, Mitchell Paige (return specialist); IOWA: Cole Fisher, Jaleel Johnson, Dillon Kidd, Jordan Lomax, Desmond King (return specialist), Marshall Koehn, Matt VandeBerg, Sean Welsh; MARYLAND: Jermaine Carter, Sean Davis, Brandon Ross; MICHIGAN: Joe Bolden, Ben Braden, Jehu Chesson, Mason Cole, Amara Darboh, Graham Glasgow, Ryan Glasgow, Willie Henry, Royce Jenkins-Stone, Jourdan Lewis (return specialist), Desmond Morgan, Blake O'Neil, Jabrill Peppers (return specialist), Jake Rudock, Chris Wormley; MICHIGAN STATE: Donavan Clark, Demetrious Cox, Darien Harris, Joel Heath, Jon Reschke; MINNESOTA: Shannon Brooks, De'Vondre Campbell, Theiren Cockran, Brandon Lingen, Jack Lynn, KJ Maye, Jonah Pirsig, Cody Poock, Steven Richardson, Ryan Santoso; NEBRASKA: Cethan Carter; OHIO STATE: Eli Apple, Gareon Conley, Tyquan Lewis, Jalin Marshall (wide receiver/return specialist), Braxton Miller, Billy Price, Tyvis Powell, Nick Vannett; PENN STATE: Marcus Allen, Jason Cabinda, Grant Haley, DaeSean Hamilton; PURDUE: Anthony Brown, Markell Jones, Robert Kugler, Jake Replogle, Frankie Williams; RUTGERS: Quentin Gause, Keith Lumpkin, Chris Muller; WISCONSIN: Michael Dieter, Tanner McEvoy, Troy Fumagalli, Chikwe Obasih, Sojourn Shelton.

All-Americans

The 2015 College Football All-America Team is composed of the following College Football All-American first teams chosen by the following selector organizations: Associated Press (AP), Football Writers Association of America (FWAA), American Football Coaches Association (AFCA), Walter Camp Foundation (WCFF), The Sporting News (TSN), Sports Illustrated (SI), USA Today (USAT) ESPN, CBS Sports (CBS), College Football News (CFN), Scout.com, and Yahoo! Sports (Yahoo!).

Currently, the NCAA compiles consensus all-America teams in the sports of Division I-FBS football and Division I men's basketball using a point system computed from All-America teams named by coaches associations or media sources.  The system consists of three points for a first-team honor, two points for second-team honor, and one point for third-team honor.  Honorable mention and fourth team or lower recognitions are not accorded any points.  Football consensus teams are compiled by position and the player accumulating the most points at each position is named first team consensus all-American.  Currently, the NCAA recognizes All-Americans selected by the AP, AFCA, FWAA, TSN, and the WCFF to determine Consensus and Unanimous All-Americans. Any player named to the First Team by all five of the NCAA-recognized selectors is deemed a Unanimous All-American.

*AFCA All-America Team
*USA Today All-America Team
*CBS Sports All-America Team
*Sports Illustrated All-America Team
*Walter Camp Football Foundation All-America Team
*Associated Press All-America Team
*ESPN.com All-America Team
*Football Writers Association of America All-America Team
*Fox Sports All-America Team
*Sporting News All-America Team
*Athlon Sports All-America Team
*Phil Steele All-America Team

Academic All-Americans

2015 CoSIDA Academic-All Americans

National award winners

Jim Thorpe Award
Desmond King, Iowa

Lombardi Award
Carl Nassib, Penn State

Lott IMPACT Trophy
Carl Nassib, Penn State

Eddie Robinson Coach of the Year
Kirk Ferentz, Iowa

NCAA List of National Award Winners

Attendance

2016 Big Ten NFL Draft Selections

2016 NFL Draft

47 Big Ten athletes were selected in the 2016 NFL Draft.

In the explanations below, (PD) indicates trades completed prior to the start of the draft (i.e. Pre-Draft), while (D) denotes trades that took place during the 2016 draft.

Round one

Round two

Round three

Round four

Round five

Round six

Round seven

Head coaches

 Bill Cubit, Illinois (interim)
 Kevin R. Wilson, Indiana
 Kirk Ferentz, Iowa
 Randy Edsall / Mike Locksley (interim)*, Maryland 
 Jim Harbaugh, Michigan
 Mark Dantonio, Michigan State
 Jerry Kill / Tracy Claeys*, Minnesota

 Mike Riley, Nebraska
 Pat Fitzgerald, Northwestern
 Urban Meyer, Ohio State
 James Franklin, Penn State
 Darrell Hazell, Purdue
 Kyle Flood, Rutgers
 Paul Chryst, Wisconsin

*Maryland fired Randy Edsall six games into the season.  Offensive coordinator Mike Locksley was named interim coach for the remainder of the season

*Jerry Kill stepped down as Minnesota's coach on October 28, 2015 due to health reasons.  Defensive coordinator Tracy Claeys was named interim coach for a couple of weeks and then named the permanent replacement on November 11.Tracy Claeys hired on a permanent basis

References

Source